Bhaskar Jadhav is an Indian politician and former Minister for Labour & Special Assistance, Maharashtra State. He is also the ex-president of Maharashtra state unit of Nationalist Congress Party (NCP) and MLA of Maharashtra from Guhagar. Formerly he also served as Minister of State for Urban Development, Forest, Port, Sports, Parliamentary Affairs, Youth Welfare, Ex-Defence Welfare, Law & Order, Fisheries and Guardian Minister  of Ratnagiri.

Jadhav was member of assembly from Chiplun constituency.   Following the clashes with the leadership, he quit Shivsena and contested assembly election as an independent candidate in 2004. He lost by 3000 votes to NCP candidate Ramesh Kadam. It was for the first time that a Shivsena candidate lost deposit in Konkan region. Prabhakar Shinde was an official Shivsena candidate.

Some years after 2004 elections, Bhaskar Jadhav joined NCP. He was elected as member of legislative council representing Konkan Local Bodies constituency. In 2009 assembly elections, NCP fielded him as a candidate from Guhagar constituency where he won by 12000 votes defeating the then Leader of Opposition Ramdas Kadam and a strong BJP rebel, 4th time sitting MLA Vinay Natu.

Bhaskar Jadhav had also won the Outstanding Parliamentarian Award.

In September 2019, Jadhav joined Shiv Sena.

Positions held 
 1992:	Elected as Member of Ratnagiri Zilla Parishad
 1995: Elected as Member of Maharashtra Legislative Assembly 
 1999: Re-Elected as Member of Maharashtra Legislative Assembly 
 2006: Elected as Member of Maharashtra Legislative Council
 2009: Re-Elected as Member of Maharashtra Legislative Assembly 
 2009: Appointed Minister of state for Urban Development, Forest, Port, Sports, Parliamentary Affairs, Youth Welfare, Ex-Defence Welfare, Fisheries, Law & Order
 2009:	Appointed Guardian Minister of Ratnagiri District
 2013:	Appointed Maharashtra State President of NCP
 2014: Re-Elected as Member of Maharashtra Legislative Assembly 
 2019: Re-Elected as Member of Maharashtra Legislative Assembly

References

External links
 The Shivsena

People from Ratnagiri district
Living people
Marathi politicians
Maharashtra MLAs 2009–2014
1957 births
Maharashtra MLAs 2014–2019
Maharashtra MLAs 1995–1999
Maharashtra MLAs 1999–2004
Members of the Maharashtra Legislative Council
Nationalist Congress Party politicians from Maharashtra
Maharashtra district councillors
Shiv Sena politicians